John P. Roth is an American government official who serves as the Assistant Secretary of the Air Force (Financial Management & Comptroller) since February 2, 2018 and had served as the Acting United States Secretary of the Air Force from January 20, 2021 to July 28, 2021 and the Acting United States Under Secretary of the Air Force from June 1, 2019 to October 18, 2019. He served as the Acting Under Secretary of Defense (Comptroller) from January 20, 2017 to June 1, 2017.

Education
1974: Bachelor of Arts, University of Virginia
1977: Master of Science in Public Administration, George Washington University

References

External links

 Biography at U.S. Air Force

|-

|-

|-

Biden administration personnel
George Washington University alumni
Living people
Trump administration personnel
United States Secretaries of the Air Force
United States Under Secretaries of Defense
University of Virginia alumni
Year of birth missing (living people)